WQSU (88.9 FM, "The Pulse") is a non-commercial college FM radio station licensed to serve Selinsgrove, Pennsylvania. The station is owned and operated by Susquehanna University and is staffed by students and faculty of the university as well as community volunteers. The station is run under the supervision of the university's Department of Communications, having been developed as an educational facility. At 10,500 watts, WQSU is the most powerful student-run college FM radio station in Pennsylvania, and as such it serves approximately one-third of the state with a variety of music, news, information, public affairs, and sports programming 365 days a year.

The operation of WQSU-FM serves two separate and distinct purposes. The first is to serve the public interest as mandated by the Federal Communications Commission, and the second is to serve Susquehanna University in its educational mission by training students in various forms of broadcasting principles and operations, serving as a media outlet for Susquehanna University.

Programming from Monday to Friday consists of modern and alternative rock, although there are specialty shows including numerous music genres including classic rock. Saturday programming consists of country and bluegrass as well as Willow Crossing. Sundays have a variety of specialty programming including blues, techno, classical, the Grateful Dead, and Susquehanna University's church service. WQSU also regularly airs a wide variety of news and sports coverage.

During the school year, the station is on-air from 9 A.M. until 2 A.M. During school breaks, including the summer, the station is on-air from noon until 2 A.M. When the station is not programming live from its studios, it rebroadcasts WVIA-FM programming, which includes classical music and some National Public Radio shows including Morning Edition, All Things Considered and Car Talk, as well as A Prairie Home Companion from American Public Media.

The station's on-air schedule can be found on the Radio FX App.

Willow Crossing 
Willow Crossing is a WQSU specialty show that began in the 1980s and has survived as a mainstay for over 30 years. The creator of the drama show, Jack Guyot Smith, also acts as the performer.

History

In 1961, WQSU began as a club named "The Radio Association" pioneered by Ken Selinger.

In 1967, Triangle Publications of Philadelphia executive Clyde Spitzer helps the Radio Association progress by donating equipment.

On May 14, 1967, WQSU was assigned their call letters by the Federal Communications Commission and aired for the first time at 91.5 MHz FM with a 10-watt transmitter.

On March 20, 1975, WQSU increased its broadcast power from 10 watts to 5600 watts and changed frequencies from 91.5 MHz to its current frequency of 88.9 MHz.

On February 1, 1980, WQSU began broadcasting in stereo.

In January 1983, WQSU increased its broadcast power from 5600 watts to 12,000 watts.

On March 15, 1985, WQSU moved from its original home at 530 University Avenue to the Degenstein Campus Center at Susquehanna University.

On November 22, 2013 at 10 AM, WQSU began broadcasting in HD. WQSU was the 76th radio station in Pennsylvania to begin broadcasting in HD, and the 5th college radio station in Pennsylvania to begin broadcasting in HD.

In 2016, WQSU station's general manager since 1967, Larry Augustine, retired his position to Dawn Marie Benfer.

On March 27, 2017, the FCC granted Susquehanna University a construction permit to reduce the station's ERP from 12,000 watts to 10,500 watts. The FCC granted the station a new license with the reduced ERP on March 18, 2019.

On October 30, 2017, WQSU celebrated its 50 years of being on air.

Notable alumni

Awards 
On March 27, 2010, WQSU was awarded second place in the Radio C Sports Play-By-Play category at the Pennsylvania AP News awards in Grantville, Pa. for the Feb. 28, 2009 broadcasting of the Landmark Conference Men's Basketball Championship game.

In 2018, WQSU won two Pennsylvania Association of Broadcasters (PAB) awards:

 WQSU 50 Years of College Radio, WQSU team, Judge Merit Award, and
 WQSU River Hawks Football, Outstanding Radio Coverage of a Local Sporting Event.

On February 20, 2019, WQSU became the first university radio station in Pennsylvania to have won a Pennsylvania Association of Broadcasters Excellence in Broadcasting award. After its 18th Annual Toys for Tots drive, WQSU was awarded Outstanding Station Sponsored Event.

WQSU won four golden microphone awards, and nominated for five other awards, from the Intercollegiate Broadcasting System on March 7, 2019 in N.Y.:

 Best College Radio Station Under 10k Students,
 Best Station Facilities,
 Best Use of Facebook and,
 Best On Air Pledge Drive.

WQSU Staff

References

External links
 
 Susquehanna University's Website
 
 
 

QSU
QSU
HD Radio stations